Jacques Houssin (19 Septembre 1902 – 8 May 1979) was a French film director and screenwriter.

Filmography

Director 
 1933 : Plein aux as
 1935 : Odette
 1937 : Rendez-vous Champs-Élysées 
 1938 : Les Deux Combinards
 1939 : Prince Bouboule
 1939 : Feux de joie
 1943 : Le Mistral
 1943 : Feu Nicolas
 1944 : Le Merle blanc
 1947 : Le Secret du Florida
 1947 : En êtes-vous bien sûr ? with Martine Carol
 1949 : Vient de paraître after the play by Édouard Bourdet

Assistant director 
 1929 : The Shark by Henri Chomette
 1930 : Under the Roofs of Paris by René Clair
 1932 : Barranco, Ltd, by André Berthomieu
 1933 : Prenez garde à la peinture, by Henri Chomette

References

External links 
 
 15 films liés à Jacques Houssin sur CinéRessources.net

1902 births
1979 deaths
20th-century French screenwriters
Film directors from Paris